Günter Hoffmann may refer to:

Günter Hoffmann (cyclist) (born 1939), German Olympic cyclist
Günter Hoffmann (1951–1984), German singer, part of the duet Hoffmann & Hoffmann with his brother, Michael Hoffmann
Günther Hoffmann-Schönborn (1905–1970), officer in the German Wehrmacht

See also
Gunther O. Hofmann